Ignacio Andrés Yepez Guzmán (born 20 October, 1998) is a Colombian footballer.

Career

In 2017, Yepez signed for Peñarol, the most successful team in Uruguay. However, his contract with previous club Atlético Junior had not ended so was unable to play until the  situation was solved. On top of that, Yepez then sustained an injury that kept him out for 10 months. After failing to make a league appearance with Peñarol and Danubio, he signed for C.S.D. Villa Española before joining C.A. Cerro.

References

External links

 Ignacio Yepez at Soccerway

Colombian footballers
Living people
Association football midfielders
Association football forwards
1998 births